was the 54th emperor of Japan, according to the traditional order of succession.  Ninmyō's reign lasted from 833 to 850, during the Heian period.

Traditional narrative
Ninmyō was the second son of Emperor Saga and the Empress Tachibana no Kachiko. After his death, he was given the title .

Ninmyō had nine Empresses, Imperial consorts, and concubines (kōi); and the emperor had 24 Imperial sons and daughters.

Emperor Ninmyō is traditionally venerated at his tomb; the Imperial Household Agency designates , in Fushimi-ku, Kyoto, as the location of Ninmyō's mausoleum.

Events of Ninmyō's life

Ninmyō ascended to the throne following the abdication of his uncle, Emperor Junna.

 6 January 823: Received the title of Crown Prince at the age of 14.
 22 March 833: In the 10th year of Emperor Junna's reign, the emperor abdicated; and the succession (senso) was received by his adopted son.  Masara-shinnō was the natural son of Emperor Saga, and therefore would have been Junna's nephew.  Shortly thereafter, Emperor Ninmyo is said to have acceded to the throne (sokui).

Shortly after Ninmyo was enthroned, he designated an heir.  He named Prince Tsunesada, a son of former Emperor Junna, as the crown prince.

 835: Kūkai (known posthumously as Kōbō-Daishi) died.  This monk, scholar, poet, and artist had been the founder of the Shingon or "True Word" school of Buddhism.
 838-839 (Jōwa  5-6): Diplomatic mission to Tang China headed by Fujiwara no Tsunetsugu.
842: Following a coup d'état called the Jōwa Incident, Tsunesada the crown prince was replaced with Ninmyō's first son, Prince Michiyasu (later Emperor Montoku) whose mother was the Empress Fujiwara no Junshi, a daughter of sadaijin Fujiwara no Fuyutsugu. It is supposed that this was the result of political intrigue planned by Ninmyō and Fujiwara no Yoshifusa.  The first of what would become a powerful line of Fujiwara regents,  Yoshifusa had numerous family ties to the imperial court; he was Ninmyō's brother in law (by virtue of his sister who became Ninmyō's consort), the second son of sadaijin Fuyutsugu, and uncle to the new crown prince.

In his lifetime, Ninmyō could not have anticipated that his third son, Prince Tokiyasu, would eventually ascend the throne in 884 as Emperor Kōkō.

 6 May 850 ({{nihongo foot|Kashō 3, 21st day of the 3rd month|嘉祥三年三月二十一日}}): Emperor Ninmyō died at the age of 41.  He was sometimes posthumously referred to as "the Emperor of Fukakusa", because that was the name given to his tomb.

Eras of Ninmyō's reign
The years of Ninmyō's reign are more specifically identified by more than one era name (nengō).
 Tenchō  (824–834)
 Jōwa    (834–848)
 Kashō    (848–851)

Kugyō
 is a collective term for the very few most powerful men attached to the court of the Emperor of Japan in pre-Meiji eras.

In general, this elite group included only three to four men at a time.  These were hereditary courtiers whose experience and background would have brought them to the pinnacle of a life's career.  During Ninmyō's reign, this apex of the Daijō-kan included:
 Sadaijin, Fujiwara no Otsugu (藤原緒嗣), 773–843.
 Sadaijin, Minamoto no Tokiwa (源常), 812–854.
 Udaijin, Kiyohara no Natsuno (清原夏野), 782–837.
 Udaijin, Fujiwara no Mimori (藤原三守), d. 840.
 Udaijin, Minamoto no Tokiwa (源常)
 Udaijin, Tachibana no Ujikimi (橘氏公), 783–847.
 Udaijin, Fujiwara no Yoshifusa (藤原良房), 804–872.
 Udaijin, Fujiwara no Otsugu, 825–832
 Naidaijin (not appointed)
 Dainagon, Fujiwara no Otsugu, ?–825.

Consorts and children

Consort (Nyōgo) later Empress Dowager (Tai-Kōtaigō): Fujiwara no Junshi (藤原順子; 809–871), Fujiwara no Fuyutsugu’s daughter
First Son: Imperial Prince Michiyasu (道康親王) later Emperor Montoku

Consort (Nyōgo): Fujiwara no Takushi/Sawako (藤原沢子; d.839), Fujiwara no Fusatsugu’s daughter
Second Son: Imperial Prince Muneyasu (宗康親王; 828–868)
Third Son: Imperial Prince Tokiyasu (時康親王) later Emperor Kōkō
Fourth Son: Imperial Prince Saneyasu (人康親王; 831–872)
Imperial Princess Shinshi (新子内親王; d.897)

Consort (Nyōgo): Fujiwara no Teishi/Sadako (藤原貞子; d.864), Fujiwara no Tadamori’s daughter
Eighth Son: Imperial Prince Nariyasu (成康親王; 836–853)
Imperial Princess Shinshi (親子内親王; d. 851)
Imperial Princess Heishi (平子内親王; d. 877)

Court lady: Shigeno no Tsunako (滋野縄子), Shigeno no Sadanushi’s daughter
fifth Son: Imperial Prince Motoyasu (本康親王; d. 902)
Ninth Daughter: Imperial Princess Tokiko (時子内親王; d. 847), 2nd Saiin in Kamo Shrine 831–833
Imperial Princess Jūshi (柔子内親王; d. 869)

Consort (Nyōgo): Tachibana no Kageko (橘影子; d. 864), Tachibana no Ujikimi’s daughter

Consort (Nyōgo): Fujiwara Musuko (藤原息子)

Court Attendant (Koui): Ki no Taneko (紀種子; d. 869), Ki no Natora’s daughter
Seventh Prince: Imperial Prince Tsuneyasu (常康親王; d. 869)
Imperial Princess Shinshi/Saneko (真子内親王; d. 870)

Court Attendant (Koui) (deposed in 845): Mikuni-machi (三国町), daughter of Mikuni clan
Sada no Noboru (貞登), given the family name "Sada" from Emperor (Shisei Kōka, 賜姓降下) in 866

Court lady: Fujiwara no Katoko (藤原賀登子), Fujiwara no Fukutomaro's daughter
Sixth Son: Imperial Prince Kuniyasu (国康親王; d. 898)

Court lady: Fujiwara no Warawako (藤原小童子), Fujiwara no Michitō's daughter
Imperial Princess Shigeko (重子内親王; d. 865)

Court lady: Princess Takamune (高宗女王), Prince Okaya's daughter
Seventh/eighth Daughter: Imperial Princess Hisako (久子内親王; d. 876), 18th Saiō in Ise Shrine 833–850.

Court lady: daughter of Yamaguchi clan (山口氏の娘)
Minamoto no Satoru (源覚; 849–879)

Nyoju: Kudaraō Toyofuku's daughter
Minamoto no Masaru (源多; 831–888), Udaijin 882–888
Minamoto no Hikaru (源光; 846–913), Udaijin 901–913

Court lady (Nyoju): Kudara no Yōkyō (百済永慶), Kudara no Kyōfuku's daughter
Twelfth Daughter: Imperial Princess Takaiko (高子内親王; d. 866), 3rd Saiin in Kamo Shrine 833–850

(from unknown women)
Minamoto no Suzushi (源冷; 835–890), Sangi 882–890
Minamoto no Itaru (源効)

Ancestry

See also
 Emperor Go-Fukakusa, a later emperor named in honor of Emperor Ninmyō
 Imperial cult
 List of Emperors of Japan
 Shoku Nihon Kōki, a Japanese national history covering Emperor Ninmyō's reign.

Notes

References
 Adolphson, Mikael S., Edward Kamens and Stacie Matsumoto. (2007).  Heian Japan, centers and peripheries. Honolulu: University of Hawaii Press. 
 
 
 
 Nussbaum, Louis-Frédéric and Käthe Roth. (2005).  Japan encyclopedia. Cambridge: Harvard University Press. ;  
 Ponsonby-Fane, Richard Arthur Brabazon. (1959).  The Imperial House of Japan. Kyoto: Ponsonby Memorial Society. 
 Titsingh, Isaac. (1834). Nihon Ōdai Ichiran; ou,  Annales des empereurs du Japon.  Paris: Royal Asiatic Society, Oriental Translation Fund of Great Britain and Ireland.  
 Varley, H. Paul. (1980). Jinnō Shōtōki: A Chronicle of Gods and Sovereigns. New York: Columbia University Press. ;

External links
 Hokusai: Poem #12, image of ceremonial event in Ninmyō's court

 
 

Japanese emperors
808 births
850 deaths
9th-century rulers in Asia
9th-century Japanese monarchs